Roland Kirchler (born 29 September 1970, in Innsbruck) is a retired Austrian football player.

Club career
Kirchler played for FC Tirol Innsbruck from 1990 through 2002 and then at 32 decided to move abroad. But he returned to Austria after playing only one game in the Chinese league to sign for Salzburg. After one and a half season at Pasching he rejoined Salzburg before moving to SC Rheindorf Altach. In summer 2008 he joined his first club, WSG Wattens to finish his career where it took off in 1989.

International career
He made his debut for Austria in a March 1993 friendly match against Greece but was overlooked for the 1998 FIFA World Cup and only became a regular after the tournament. He earned 28 caps, scoring 5 goals. His last international was a March 2005 World Cup qualification match against Wales.

National team statistics

Honours
Austrian Football Bundesliga (3):
 2000, 2001, 2002
Austrian Cup (1):
 1993

External links
Player profile - WSG Wattens
Profile - Weltfussball  

1970 births
Living people
Sportspeople from Innsbruck
Footballers from Tyrol (state)
Austrian footballers
Austria international footballers
Austrian Football Bundesliga players
FC Tirol Innsbruck players
Beijing Guoan F.C. players
FC Red Bull Salzburg players
Austrian expatriate sportspeople in China
SC Rheindorf Altach players
Austrian expatriate footballers
Expatriate footballers in China
Association football midfielders
FC Wacker Innsbruck (2002) managers
WSG Tirol managers
WSG Tirol players